The retinenes (retinene1 and retinene2) are chemical derivatives of vitamin A (see retinol) formed through oxidation reactions.

Retinene1 is better known as retinal and is fundamental in the transduction of light into visual signals in the photoreceptor level of the retina (known as the visual cycle).  Retinene2 is more formally known as dehydroretinal.

The energy of impinging photons will convert retinaldehyde from an 11-cis isomer into an all-trans form.  In the retina, this conversion induces a conformational change in the surrounding opsin protein pigment, leading to signaling through the G protein transducin. Retinaldehyde also forms a part of bacteriorhodopsin, a light-induced proton pump found in some archaea.

Experimentally, it is possible to replace 11-cis retinaldehyde by perfusing retinal tissue preparations with retinaldehyde derivatives.  Selective modification of the retinaldehyde structure, particularly the density of electrons in the π-orbitals, can lead to insights into the interaction between the retinaldehyde moiety and the surrounding pigment protein.

"The names of all these molecules have recently been changed ... vitamin A is now retinol, retinene is retinal; there is also retinoic acid"—George Wald (1967).

See also
Retinal
Visual cycle

References

Aldehydes

de:Retinal
pl:Retinal
zh:视黄醛